Savar-e Gheyb (also Romanized as Savār-e Gheyb and Savārgheyb) is a village in Dezh Gah Rural District, Dehram District, Farashband County, Fars Province, Iran. At the 2006 census, its population was 158, in 31 families.

References 

Populated places in Farashband County